Beginnings is an album by the progressive rock band Happy the Man, released in 1990 but composed of material written and recorded during Happy the Man's first two years, 1974 and 1975. Originally recorded on 2- and 4-track tape as demos, the material was compiled and transferred to DAT where additional mixing and processing was added by Kit Watkins.

Track listing
"Leave That Kitten Alone, Armone" (Wyatt)- 9:16 
"Passion's Passing" (Wyatt)  – 8:40
"Don't Look to The Running Sun" (Cliff Fortney) – 9:52
"Gretchen's Garden" (Wyatt/Ken Whitaker) – 11:04
"Partly The State" (Kit Watkins) – 5:49
"Broken Waves" (Wyatt) – 4:53
"Portrait of a Waterfall" (Whitaker) – 6:45

Personnel
Cliff Fortney - lead vocals (2-5), flute (2-5), electric piano (2-5)
Stanley Whitaker - six and twelve string guitars, backing and lead vocals
Kit Watkins - keyboards, backing vocals
Frank Wyatt - keyboards, backing vocals, alto saxophone, flute
Rick Kennell - bass
Mike Beck - drums, percussion

Notes 

1990 albums
Happy the Man albums